"Return to Sender" is a song recorded by American singer Elvis Presley and performed in the film Girls! Girls! Girls!. The song was written by Winfield Scott and Otis Blackwell to suit Presley's rock and roll musical style. The singer laments his relationship with a spiteful partner. Released on October 2, 1962, and published by Elvis Presley Music, the song became a commercial hit and received praise for its lyricism and melody.

The song peaked at number one on the UK Singles Chart, and was the UK Christmas number one in 1962. It was also the first Christmas number one in the Irish Singles Chart. In the United States, "Return to Sender" reached No. 2 on the American Billboard singles chart, kept out of the top spot by The Four Seasons' "Big Girls Don't Cry." However, the song reached No. 1 on the rival Cash Box and Music Vendor singles charts. "Return to Sender" also went to No. 5 on the R&B charts. The single was certified platinum by the RIAA for sales in excess of one million units in the US.

Background and recording

Otis Blackwell and Winfield Scott were a team of songwriters who wrote songs for rhythm and blues artists such as LaVern Baker, Ruth Brown and Clyde McPhatter. To make a living as songwriters, they decided to begin writing pop and country songs for the likes of Carl Perkins, Conway Twitty, Johnnie Ray, Connie Francis, and Elvis Presley. After Blackwell wrote Presley's hits "Don't Be Cruel" (1956) and "All Shook Up" (1957), Freddy Bienstock, vice president of the record company Hill & Range, looked to the duo to write songs for Presley's films. Hill & Range asked Blackwell to write songs for the Presley vehicle Girls! Girls! Girls! (1962). Following the commercial disappointment of Presley's pop ballad "She's Not You" (1962), the record company wanted him to return to the rock and roll genre without alienating fans who enjoyed his crooning.

Scripts for Presley films would note places where a song was to be inserted into the film as well as suggested titles and genres for the songs. While other songwriters would adhere to those notes, Blackwell and Scott would not, because they were used to the creative freedom of the rhythm and blues field. They decided to write a great song without any concern about whether fitted into the film's storyline. After penning a track about fishing, entitled "Coming in Loaded", as well as other material they disliked, the two gave up on writing other songs until they found inspiration in a returned piece of mail. A demo that they had sent to a record company was returned to them with the words "Return to sender! No such person! No such zone!" stamped onto it. Blackwell and Scott decided to use those phrases as lyrics in a song about a failing relationship between "a spiteful woman and a heartbroken man". Ironically, within only nine months of its release, it was the use of the word "zone" that became an anachronism when the USPOD or United States Post Office Department (the forerunner of the United States Postal Service) replaced all zones in 1963 with the nationwide rollout of ZIP Codes, thus making the song seem dated before its time.

Recording and composition
On March 27, 1962, Presley was handed the task of recording all thirteen songs on the Girls! Girls! Girls! soundtrack. He was unenthusiastic about the material and went through the recording process at a quickened pace. The Jordanaires, Dudley Brooks, D. J. Fontana, and Scotty Moore were in the studio, and other instrumentation on the album was provided by Boots Randolph on saxophone, Ray Siegel on bass, Barney Kessel and Tiny Timbrell on guitar, and Hal Blaine and Bernie Mattinson on specialty drums. When he began singing "Return to Sender," Presley became more energetic. He found the song easy to perform and recorded it in just two takes, modelling his vocal stylings on Blackwell's. While watching Presley perform the track, Moore and Fontana felt that the "old magic" of the singer's earlier work had returned.

"Return to Sender" is a pop and rock and roll song with a length of two minutes and nine seconds, and an up-tempo, "gently rock[ing]" beat. Per Presley's decision, the lead instrument of the song's chorus is Randolph's saxophone rather than a guitar, which was more characteristic of Presley's music. According to Ace Collins in Untold Gold: The Stories Behind Elvis's #1 Hits, the track "recaptured the happy enthusiasm and unbridled joy" of the rock and roll music of the mid-1950s. The song is about a heartbroken man whose mail to his lover is always returned unopened. Collins also noted a contrast between the song's joyful instrumentation and its lyrics, which are those of a "woeful ballad".

Critical reception
NME said that "Return to Sender" and another song penned by Blackwell, Jerry Lee Lewis' "Great Balls of Fire" (1957), stand as "some of the most enduring classics in the rock and roll canon". In his book Untold Gold: The Stories Behind Elvis's #1 Hits, Ace Collins says that while Blackwell wrote hits like Lewis' "Breathless" (1958) and "Fever" by Peggy Lee (1958), and influenced artists like Presley and Stevie Wonder, "it is doubtful that he ever wrote anything quite as innovative as 'Return to Sender'." Thomas Ward of AllMusic praised the song's lyrics, production, and melody, as well as Presley's vocal performance. Ward concluded his review by saying that "Although 'Return To Sender' is not a huge artistic triumph, it's a great pop song that still sounds good to modern audiences".

Legacy
Gerri Granger later recorded an answer song: "Don't Want Your Letters". The song was arranged and conducted by Bert Keyes, and was released on the single Big Top 45–3128.

"Return to Sender" came back into vogue in 1993 when the U.S. Postal Service issued a commemorative postage stamp honoring Presley on what would have been his 58th birthday. Fans mailed envelopes franked with first-day issues of this stamp to fictitious addresses so that they would receive their letters back, marked with the words "return to sender".

The phrase "Return to Sender" was engraved on the coffin of Freddie Starr, a comedian and Elvis impersonator.

Charts

Weekly charts

Certifications and sales

References

Bibliography

External links
Elvis Presley Studio Recording Sessions: March 27, 1962

1962 singles
Elvis Presley songs
Cashbox number-one singles
UK Singles Chart number-one singles
Irish Singles Chart number-one singles
Number-one singles in Norway
Songs written by Otis Blackwell
Songs written by Winfield Scott (songwriter)
1962 songs
RCA Victor singles
Songs written for films
Christmas number-one singles in the United Kingdom